Pietro Visconti (born 24 May 1989) is an Italian football player.

Club career
He made his professional debut in the Serie B for Piacenza on 30 May 2009 in a game against Vicenza.

On 16 January 2020 he agreed on a contract with Serie C club Pontedera.

References

External links
 

1989 births
People from Fiorenzuola d'Arda
Living people
Italian footballers
Association football defenders
Piacenza Calcio 1919 players
Serie B players
F.C. Pavia players
Serie C players
U.S. Cremonese players
U.S. Avellino 1912 players
Trapani Calcio players
Novara F.C. players
U.S. Città di Pontedera players
Footballers from Emilia-Romagna
Sportspeople from the Province of Piacenza